820 Adriana, provisional designation 1916 ZB, is an exceptionally dark asteroid from the outer region of the asteroid belt, about 59 kilometers in diameter. It was discovered by German astronomer Max Wolf at Heidelberg Observatory in southern Germany, on 30 March 1916.

The asteroid orbits the Sun at a distance of 3.0–3.3 AU once every 5 years and 7 months (2,027 days). Its orbit shows an eccentricity of 0.05 and is tilted by 6 degrees to the plane of the ecliptic. According to the survey carried out by the Infrared Astronomical Satellite, IRAS, the asteroid's surface has an extremely low albedo of 0.02. The body's spectral type remains unknown, as does its rotation period. By 2014, there were only 22 asteroids with an unknown rotation period for the low-numbered asteroids up to number 1000 (also see 398 Admete).

Any reference of this name to a person or occurrence is unknown.

References

External links 
 Asteroid Lightcurve Database (LCDB), query form (info )
 Dictionary of Minor Planet Names, Google books
 Asteroids and comets rotation curves, CdR – Observatoire de Genève, Raoul Behrend
 Discovery Circumstances: Numbered Minor Planets (1)-(5000) – Minor Planet Center
 
 

000820
Discoveries by Max Wolf
Named minor planets
19160330